Rampurhat College, established in 1950, is a government affiliated college located at Rampurhat in the Birbhum district of West Bengal. It is affiliated to University of Burdwan and teaches arts, science and commerce.

History

Departments

Science

Chemistry 
Physics 
Mathematics
Botany
Zoology

Arts and Commerce

Bengali
English
Sanskrit
History
Geography
Political Science
Philosophy
Economics 
Commerce

Accreditation
Recently, Rampurhat College has been awarded B grade by the National Assessment and Accreditation Council (NAAC). The college is also recognized by the University Grants Commission (UGC).

See also

References

External links
Official website

Colleges affiliated to University of Burdwan
Educational institutions established in 1950
Universities and colleges in Birbhum district
1950 establishments in West Bengal